The Sikkim Legislative Assembly election of 2009 took place in April 2009, concurrently with the 2009 Indian general election. The elections were held in the state for all 32 legislative assembly seats along with the third phase of 2009 Indian general elections on 30 April 2009. The results were declared on 5 May 2009. The Sikkim Democratic Front (SDF) further strengthened their majority in the Sikkim Assembly by winning all the seats. Incumbent Chief Minister Pawan Kumar Chamling's Government returned for an unprecedented fourth consecutive term having won previous elections in 1994, 1999, and 2004.

Previous Assembly
In the 2004 Sikkim Legislative Assembly election, the SDF almost had a clean-sweep winning 31 of the 32 seats in the state. Congress was the only other party to win any seats, winning the Sangha seat that is reserved for the monks and nuns of Sikkim's many monasteries. P.K. Chamling led SDF had already formed the previous two Governments in Sikkim having first formed the Government after the 1994 election, when they won 19 seats within a year of the party being formed), and then again after the 1999 election, when they increased their tally to 24 seats. Chamling's third term began on May 21, 2004, when he and his 11cabinate ministers were sworn in by the then Governor of Sikkim V. Rama Rao.

Background
With the tenure of the Sikkim Assembly scheduled to expire on 23 May 23, 2009, the Election Commission of India announced on 2 March 2009, that the elections to the Sikkim Assembly would be held at the same time as the general election. Sikkim voted in the third phase of the 5-phase national election.

Though SDF had provided external support to Manmohan Singh's Congress-led UPA Government at the Centre since 2004, the SDF and Congress were the main political opponents in Sikkim. Ironically, the Congress was led in the state by Nar Bahadur Bhandari, mentor and former colleague of Chamling.

In this election UDF was formed by coalition of BJP, INC and few other parties, which was thrown into disarray with its constituents appearing to go separate.

Schedule of election

Parties and candidates

Results

Government formation
The SDF went from strength to strength and this time won even the single seat that had eluded them in 2004. With a clean sweep of all 32 seats in the state, Chamling was sworn in for his fourth consecutive term as Chief Minister by Governor B.P. Singh at the Gangtok Raj Bhawan on May 20, 2009. This Government included Neeru Sewa and Tilu Gurung who became the first ever women Cabinet ministers in Sikkim.

Number of seats

Elected members

See also
 State Assembly elections in India, 2009
 Indian general election in Sikkim, 2009
 Assembly election results of Sikkim

References

State Assembly elections in Sikkim
2009 State Assembly elections in India
2000s in Sikkim